Harassed, also known as The Exploiteers or The Pink Pussy: Where Sin Lives,, is a 1964 Argentine sexploitation film directed and written by Alberto Dubois. The film starred Libertad Leblanc and Néstor Zavarce.

Release
Harassed premiered on 10 September 1964 in Buenos Aires, Argentina. The film was produced and distributed by Gloria Films. It was not until 1 June 1966 that the film premiered in the US in Champaign, Illinois. In the US, the film was dubbed in the English language and distributed by Cambist Films.

Cast
Libertad Leblanc
Néstor Zavarce
Eva Moreno
June Roberts
Francisco Ferrari
José Borda
Adolfo Martínez Alcalá
Alberto Álvarez

References

External links
 

Argentine drama films
1964 films
1960s psychological drama films
1960s Spanish-language films
Sexploitation films
1960s exploitation films
1964 drama films
1960s Argentine films